The Swedish Nightingale is a 1941 German musical film directed by Peter Paul Brauer and starring Ilse Werner (singing sequences with Erna Berger's voice), Karl Ludwig Diehl, and Joachim Gottschalk. The film is based on a play by Friedrich Forster-Burggraf set in nineteenth century Copenhagen. It portrays a romance between the writer Hans Christian Andersen and the opera singer Jenny Lind, the "Swedish Nightingale" of the title.

It was shot at the Terra Studios in Berlin. The film's sets were designed by the art directors Robert Herlth and Heinrich Weidemann. Made on a budget of around one and half million Reichsmarks, it was a major commercial success on its release across Europe.

At the time when the film was made, Germany was keeping Denmark under military occupation but attempting a relatively conciliatory attitude towards the occupied Danes. Germany was also making an effort to keep good relations with the neutral Sweden. The theme of the film – made at a time when Joseph Goebbels' Propaganda Ministry kept tight control of the German film industry – fit well with these policy aims.

Cast

References

Bibliography

External links 
 

1941 films
1940s historical musical films
1940s biographical films
German historical musical films
German biographical films
Films of Nazi Germany
1940s German-language films
Films directed by Peter Paul Brauer
German black-and-white films
Films set in Denmark
Films set in the 19th century
German films based on plays
Biographical films about singers
Biographical films about writers
Cultural depictions of Jenny Lind
Cultural depictions of Hans Christian Andersen
Terra Film films
1940s German films